Fertőszentmiklós is a small town in Győr-Moson-Sopron county, Hungary.

Geography 
Fertőszentmiklós is located on the Small Plain and it is part of the Transdanubian region. It has a population of 3854 people (2015). Fertőszentmiklós is very well situated because it's close to the Hungarian-Austrian border. The name of the town comes from the fusion of two smaller villages: Szentmiklós and Szerdahely. So they called the new village Fertőszentmiklós.

Twin towns — sister cities
Fertőszentmiklós is twinned with:

  Pleidelsheim, Germany (1994)
  Leopoldov, Slovakia (2003)

References

External links

  in Hungarian
 Street map 
 http://www.nemzetijelkepek.hu/onkormanyzat-fertoszentmiklos_en.shtml

Populated places in Győr-Moson-Sopron County